Hypotrachyna is a genus of lichenized fungi within the family Parmeliaceae. According to the Dictionary of the Fungi (10th edition, 2008), the widespread genus contains about 198 species. Hypotrachyna was circumscribed by American lichenologist Mason Ellsworth Hale Jr in 1974.

Species

Hypotrachyna adaffinis
Hypotrachyna addita
Hypotrachyna adducta
Hypotrachyna adjuncta
Hypotrachyna aguirrei
Hypotrachyna ahtiana
Hypotrachyna alectorialiorum
Hypotrachyna andensis
Hypotrachyna angustissima
Hypotrachyna anzeana
Hypotrachyna aspera
Hypotrachyna bahiana
Hypotrachyna bogotensis
Hypotrachyna booralensis
Hypotrachyna boquetensis
Hypotrachyna bostrychodes
Hypotrachyna brasiliana
Hypotrachyna brevidactylata
Hypotrachyna brevirhiza

Hypotrachyna brueggeri
Hypotrachyna britannica
Hypotrachyna caraccensis
Hypotrachyna cendensis
Hypotrachyna chicitae
Hypotrachyna chlorina
Hypotrachyna citrella
Hypotrachyna colensoica
Hypotrachyna consimilis
Hypotrachyna convexa
Hypotrachyna costaricensis
Hypotrachyna croceopustulata
Hypotrachyna culbersoniorum
Hypotrachyna dactylifera
Hypotrachyna dahlii
Hypotrachyna densirhizinata
Hypotrachyna dentella
Hypotrachyna ducalis
Hypotrachyna enderythraea
Hypotrachyna endochlora
Hypotrachyna ensifolia
Hypotrachyna erythrodes
Hypotrachyna evansii
Hypotrachyna everniastroides
Hypotrachyna exsecta
Hypotrachyna exsplendens
Hypotrachyna fissicarpa
Hypotrachyna flavida
Hypotrachyna flavospinulosa
Hypotrachyna galbinica
Hypotrachyna gondylophora
Hypotrachyna guatemalensis
Hypotrachyna habenula
Hypotrachyna hafellneri
Hypotrachyna halei
Hypotrachyna heterochroa
Hypotrachyna ikomae
Hypotrachyna imbricatula
Hypotrachyna immaculata
Hypotrachyna indica
Hypotrachyna infirma
Hypotrachyna isidiocera
Hypotrachyna isolopezii
Hypotrachyna koyaensis
Hypotrachyna laevigata
Hypotrachyna leeukopensis
Hypotrachyna leiophylla
Hypotrachyna leswellensis
Hypotrachyna ligulata
Hypotrachyna lineariloba
Hypotrachyna livida
Hypotrachyna lividescens
Hypotrachyna longiloba
Hypotrachyna lopezii
Hypotrachyna lueckingii
Hypotrachyna lythogoeana
Hypotrachyna majoris
Hypotrachyna massartii
Hypotrachyna meridiensis
Hypotrachyna meyeri
Hypotrachyna microblasta
Hypotrachyna microblastella
Hypotrachyna monilifera
Hypotrachyna neocrenata
Hypotrachyna neodissecta
Hypotrachyna neoflavida
Hypotrachyna neoscytodes
Hypotrachyna nodakensis
Hypotrachyna norlopezii
Hypotrachyna novella
Hypotrachyna obscurella
Hypotrachyna oprah
Hypotrachyna orientalis
Hypotrachyna osseoalba
Hypotrachyna osteoleuca
Hypotrachyna palmarum
Hypotrachyna paracitrella
Hypotrachyna paramensis
Hypotrachyna paraphyscioides
Hypotrachyna parasinuosa
Hypotrachyna partita
Hypotrachyna physcioides
Hypotrachyna pluriformis
Hypotrachyna polydactyla
Hypotrachyna producta
Hypotrachyna prolongata
Hypotrachyna proserpinensis
Hypotrachyna protenta
Hypotrachyna protoboliviana
Hypotrachyna protoformosana
Hypotrachyna pseudosinuosa
Hypotrachyna pulvinata
Hypotrachyna punoensis
Hypotrachyna pustulifera
Hypotrachyna radiculata
Hypotrachyna reducens
Hypotrachyna revoluta
Hypotrachyna rhabdiformis
Hypotrachyna riparia
Hypotrachyna rockii
Hypotrachyna sanjosensis
Hypotrachyna scytophylla
Hypotrachyna silvatica
Hypotrachyna sinuosa
Hypotrachyna sinuosella
Hypotrachyna spinulosa
Hypotrachyna steyermarkii
Hypotrachyna subaffinis
Hypotrachyna subformosana
Hypotrachyna sublaevigata
Hypotrachyna subpustulifera
Hypotrachyna subsaxatilis
Hypotrachyna tariensis
Hypotrachyna taylorensis
Hypotrachyna thysanota
Hypotrachyna tibellii
Hypotrachyna vainioi
Hypotrachyna velloziae
Hypotrachyna virginica

References

Lichen genera
Lecanorales genera
Taxa named by Edvard August Vainio